The Barracks Thief is a novella by American writer Tobias Wolff, first published in 1984. The story concerns paratroopers in training during the time of the Vietnam war.

Readers of Wolff's memoir In Pharaoh's Army: Memories of the Lost War (1994) will note that the author trained as a paratrooper and served in Vietnam.

Plot

In Fort Bragg, North Carolina, three recent paratrooper training graduates are temporarily attached to an airborne infantry company as they await orders to report to Vietnam. Because most of the men in the company fought together in Vietnam, the three newcomers are treated as outsiders and ignored. When money and personal property are discovered missing from the barracks, suspicion falls on the three newcomers. The narrative structure of the book contains several shifts of tone and point of view as the story unfolds.

Reception and awards
The Barracks Thief won the PEN/Faulkner Award for Fiction in 1985.

References 

1984 American novels
Novels by Tobias Wolff
Novels set during the Vietnam War
American novellas
American war novels
PEN/Faulkner Award for Fiction-winning works
Ecco Press books